Monticello is the name of Thomas Jefferson's estate near Charlottesville, Virginia in the United States.

Monticello may also refer to:

Places

France
 Monticello, Haute-Corse, a commune of the Haute-Corse département in France

Italy
 Granozzo con Monticello, a comune in the Province of Novara
 Monticello Amiata, a former comune in the Province of Grosseto, now a frazione of Cinigiano
 Monticello Brianza, a comune in the Province of Lecco
 Monticello Conte Otto, a comune in the Province of Vicenza
 Monticello d'Alba, a comune in the Province of Cuneo

United States

Municipalities
Monticello, Arkansas, a town
Monticello, California, a former town
Monticello, Florida, a town
Monticello, Georgia, a town
Monticello, Illinois, a town
Monticello Township, Illinois
Monticello, Indiana, a town
Monticello, Iowa, a town
Monticello Township, Iowa
Monticello Township, Kansas, a former township
Monticello, Kentucky, a town
Monticello, Louisiana, a town
Monticello, Maine, a town
Monticello, Minnesota, a town
Monticello Township, Minnesota
Monticello, Mississippi, a town
Monticello, Missouri, a town
Monticello, New York, a hamlet also known as Richfield
Monticello, New York, a village
Monticello, North Carolina, a town
Monticello, Ohio, an unincorporated community
Monticello, South Carolina, a community
Monticello, Utah, a town
Monticello, Green County, Wisconsin, a village
Monticello, Lafayette County, Wisconsin, a town

Other places
Monticello AVA, an American Viticultural Area in Virginia 
Monticello Dam in California

Arts, entertainment, and media
 Monticello (fictional city), the fictional locale of the soap opera The Edge of Night
"Monticello Hotel", an episode the television series Hotel Hell

Brands and enterprises
Monticello Arcade, in Norfolk, Virginia
Monticello Hotel (Longview, Washington)
The Monticello Hotel, in Norfolk, Virginia

Energy
Monticello Nuclear Generating Plant, in Minnesota
Monticello Steam Electric Station, a coal-fired power plant in Texas

Racing
Monticello Motor Club, a racing circuit near Monticello, New York
Monticello Raceway, a harness track and racing site in Sullivan County, New York; also known as the "Mighty M"

Other uses
Monticello (typeface)
Monticello Association, a private lineage society of lineal descendants of Thomas Jefferson
USS Monticello, three ships in the United States Navy

See also
 
 Monticelli (disambiguation)